Roger Lee Wallace (born July 22, 1952) is a former professional American football player, drafted 12th rd. 1974-St. Louis Football Cardinals
Played Memphis" Southmen" Grizzlies 1974/75-Wide Receiver/Punt Returner
1976 St. Louis Cardinals- 6 Exhibition Games and 1976 NY Giants as  Wide Receiver/Punt Returner. He was released by the Giants after 1977 pre-season.

External links
Roger Wallace DatabaseFootball Page

1952 births
Living people
People from Urbana, Ohio
American football wide receivers
Bowling Green Falcons football players